Léontine Zanta (14 February 1872 – 15 June 1942) was a French philosopher, feminist and novelist. One of the first two women to gain a doctorate in France, and the first to do so in philosophy, Zanta "was an intellectual celebrity in her day, active in journalism and in the feminist movement of the 1920s."

Life
Zanta was born in Mâcon. Her doctoral thesis, defended in May 1914, was on the 16th-century revival of Stoicism. She never secured a position in higher education, and became a journalist and writer, publishing several novels.

She maintained a correspondence with Teilhard de Chardin.

In the late 1920s she received the Legion of Honour. Simone de Beauvoir remembered being inspired by her example as a woman philosopher.

Works
 La renaissance du stoïcisme au XVIe siècle, 1914.
 (ed. with intro.) La traduction française du manuel d'Epictète d'André de Rivaudeau au XVIe siècle, 1914.
 Psychologie du féminisme, 1922
 La part du feu, 1927
 Sainte-Odile, 1931

References

Further reading
 Robert Garric, "Introduction", in Teilhard de Chardin, Letters to Léontine Zanta, trans. Bernard Wall. London: Collins, 1969. 
 Henri Maleprade, Léontine Zanta, vertueuse aventurière du féminisme, Paris: Rive droite, 1997. 
 Annabelle Bonnet,  Léontine Zanta – Histoire oubliée de la première docteure française en philosophie, Préface de Geneviève Fraisse, Paris: L'Harmattan, Collection logiques sociales, 2021.

External links
 

1872 births
1942 deaths
People from Mâcon
French journalists
French feminists
French women philosophers
Feminist philosophers
French women novelists
20th-century French philosophers
20th-century French women writers
Chevaliers of the Légion d'honneur